Broken Angel is a 2008 film adaptation of the novel Windy City. The film tells the real-life story of Ebru, a Turkish girl who came to the United States in the 1980s and fell prey to the image of fame and fortune. It was directed by Aclan Bates. Broken Angel premiered in Istanbul and Izmir.

Plot

A young Turkish girl comes to America in search of the life she saw in the movies and on TV. Broken Angel shows that life for a foreigner is not always the Hollywood life, especially when you do not speak the language. As she is slowly swallowed by the realities, only one boy, a deaf artist, can reach her and save her life.

The film also debates American-Turkish relations and the perceptive image of Turks in the U.S. and vice versa.

Cast
 Nehir Erdoğan as Ebru
 Ajla Hodzic as Asli
 Nilüfer Açıkalın as Filiz
 Patrick Muldoon as Kevin
 Devon Odessa as  Elizabeth
 Fay Masterson as Mimi
 Jay Karnes as Michael Levy
 Clyde Kusatsu as Dondi
 Colin Fickes as Hank
 Ayşe Nil Şamlıoğlu||
 Maree Cheatham as  Mrs. Kraus
 Zachary Charles as  Rusty
 Yuri Bradac as Grigori

Production
The picture was filmed in Los Angeles in 2007.

References

External links

2008 multilingual films
2008 drama films
2008 films
American multilingual films
2000s English-language films
English-language Turkish films
Films set in Turkey
Turkish multilingual films
Warner Bros. films